Lydia Valentín Pérez (born 10 February 1985) is a Spanish weightlifter, Olympic Champion, 2 time World Champion and 4 time European Champion competing in the 75 kg category until 2018 and 81 kg starting in 2018 after the International Weightlifting Federation reorganized the categories. Lydia has won three Olympic Medals (Silver in 2008, Gold in 2012 and Bronze in 2016), two World Weightlifting Championships (2017 and 2018), as well as four European Weightlifting Championships.

Career
At the 2007 World Championships, she ranked sixth in the 75 kg category with a total of 240 kg.

At the 2013 World Championships, she won bronze in the snatch and placed fourth in the total, being promoted to silver and bronze respectively when Olga Zubova was disqualified for failing a doping test. In 2017, Lydia won the World Weightlifting Championship held in Anaheim, United States.

At the European Championships, she won four gold medals for the total in 2014, 2015, 2017 and 2018 three silver medals (in 2008, 2012 and 2013) and three bronze medals (in 2007, 2009 and 2011), with three gold and four silver medals in the snatch, and two gold, one silver and five bronze medals in the clean and jerk.

Olympics
In 2008, Valentín competed at the 2008 Summer Olympics in the 75 kg category finishing in fifth place at the time of competition with a 250 kg total. In 2016, retests of samples from the 75 kg category at the 2008 Olympics returned positive results for the original gold medalist Cao Lei and bronze medalist Nadezhda Evstyukhina. Both were disqualified, and Valentín was awarded the silver medal.

In 2012, Valentín competed at the 2012 Summer Olympics in the 75 kg category, and finished in fourth place with a 265 kg total, behind the eight new Olympic Records set by Svetlana Podobedova and Natalia Zabolotnaya. In 2016, during retests, all three original medalists returned positive results, thus disqualifying them. Valentín was declared the Olympic Champion, and in March 2019, she was awarded her gold medal.

In 2016, while waiting for confirmation of these medals, Valentín had competed in the 2016 Olympics, where she lifted a total of 257 kg and won the bronze medal. It was, at the time, Spain's first medal ever in weightlifting (retrospectively third).

In 2021, she competed in the women's 87 kg event at the 2020 Summer Olympics in Tokyo, Japan.

Major results

See also
List of Olympic medalists in weightlifting
List of World Championships medalists in weightlifting
List of European Championships medalists in weightlifting

References

External links

 
 
 
 
 
 

1985 births
Living people
People from Ponferrada
Sportspeople from the Province of León
Spanish female weightlifters
Olympic weightlifters of Spain
Weightlifters at the 2008 Summer Olympics
Weightlifters at the 2012 Summer Olympics
Weightlifters at the 2016 Summer Olympics
Olympic gold medalists for Spain
Olympic silver medalists for Spain
Olympic bronze medalists for Spain
Olympic medalists in weightlifting
Medalists at the 2008 Summer Olympics
Medalists at the 2012 Summer Olympics
Medalists at the 2016 Summer Olympics
World Weightlifting Championships medalists
European champions in weightlifting
Mediterranean Games gold medalists for Spain
Mediterranean Games silver medalists for Spain
Mediterranean Games bronze medalists for Spain
Mediterranean Games medalists in weightlifting
Competitors at the 2013 Mediterranean Games
Competitors at the 2018 Mediterranean Games
European Weightlifting Championships medalists
Weightlifters at the 2020 Summer Olympics
20th-century Spanish women
21st-century Spanish women